The Junglies is a short-lived British 1992 animated television series by Terry Ward, lasting from 1992-1993 on TV-am.

Overview
The series is set on the fictional Junglie Island, an island somewhere near Africa. Each episode follows the adventures of several anthropomorphised animals called the Junglies, all of whom are portrayed as young children.

A total of 13 episodes were produced, and aired between 1992 and 1993 exclusively in the United Kingdom, some of which were released straight-to-video. The series has never been released on DVD, although one episode, "Flying South", was featured on the VHS and DVD versions of "A Day Full of Animals and Songs".

Characters
Like Nellie the Elephant, another series by Ward, all the characters were only voiced by two actors, in this cast, all voices were provided by Gary Wilmot and Jessica Martin:
Tyrone - An orange, energetic and mischievous tiger who is the leader of the Junglies.
Marvin - A red, mischievous and cheeky monkey.
Geraldine - An orange bucktoothed giraffe who loves butterflies.
Lester - An orange and brown outspoken lion. 
Penny - A red parrot who speaks with a Scouse accent. 
Sebastian - A green snake who speaks with a lisp. 
Henrietta - A blue hippopotamus. Her mother is the school teacher.
Ethel - A pink elephant.
Zoe - A patient zebra who speaks with a French accent.
Albert - A green alligator who (mostly) lives in a houseboat. 
Graham - A gorilla who only appears in the last episode. 
The Sun - An unnamed, anthropomorphised sun. He is not always seen, has hands and arms and a face like vertebrate animals, and wakes up (and goes to sleep) at the beginning and middle of various episodes.
 The Moon - A real, voiceless moon. The moon is not always seen, but it appears every night of the year on Junglie Island, even Christmas Day. 
 Firefly - A minor character on Junglies who appears every night of the year on Junglie Island. She is seen in the episodes "Say Cheese Everyone" and "A Journey To The Moon".

Episodes
 1. "First Day at School"
 2. "Hide And Seek"
 3. "Penny's Little Brother"
 4. "Echo Valley"
 5. "Albert's Tooth"
 6. "Journey To The Moon"
 7. "Where's Zoe"
 8. "Say Cheese Everyone"
 9. "Heavy, Heavy, Heavy"
 10. "Down the River"
 11. "Flying South"
 12. "The Great Storm"
 13. "A Very Big Monkey" (this episode was only broadcast and never commercially released)

Home video
Two VHS releases of the series were released in 1991 and 1992 by Abbey Home Entertainment.

See also
 Nellie the Elephant - another programme with similar animation designs, also by Ward.

References

External links

1992 British television series debuts
1993 British television series endings
1990s British animated television series
1990s British children's television series
British children's animated comedy television series
English-language television shows
Animated television series about children
Animated television series about mammals
Television series set on fictional islands